Hillend is a small hamlet in Midlothian, just outside the Scottish capital Edinburgh, best known for the Hillend Ski Centre, an artificial ski slope. It is near the boundary between the area administered by Midlothian and the City of Edinburgh, and gains its name for being situated on the nub end of the Pentland Hills.

It was the site of a fort, but all the stone has been removed and the land is now cultivated.

There is also Swanston Golf Course and Lothianburn Golf Course. The area is dominated by the Edinburgh city bypass. Hillend is well suited to paragliding and is flyable in NE and SE winds, although care needs to be taken when landing in the relatively small landing field. It is also a very well known camping spot among teenagers in Edinburgh.

References

External links

Villages in Midlothian